This partial list of city nicknames in North Dakota compiles the aliases, sobriquets, and slogans that cities in North Dakota are known by (or have been known by historically), officially and unofficially, to municipal governments, local people, outsiders or their tourism boards or chambers of commerce. City nicknames can help in establishing a civic identity, helping outsiders recognize a community or attracting people to a community because of its nickname; promote civic pride; and build community unity. Nicknames and slogans that successfully create a new community "ideology or myth" are also believed to have economic value. Their economic value is difficult to measure, but there are anecdotal reports of cities that have achieved substantial economic benefits by "branding" themselves by adopting new slogans.

Some unofficial nicknames are positive, while others are derisive. The unofficial nicknames listed here have been in use for a long time or have gained wide currency.
Cando – You Can Do Better in Cando
Dickinson – Queen City or Queen City of the Prairies
Drayton – Catfish Capital of the North
Hebron – The Brick City
Jamestown – The Buffalo City
Minot – The Magic City
Ray – Grain Palace City
Rugby – Geographical Center of North America
St. John – City at the end of the Rainbow
Towner – Cattle Capital of North Dakota
Velva - The Star City

See also
 List of city nicknames in the United States

References

North Dakota cities and towns
Populated places in North Dakota
City nicknames